Song Chong-gug (born 20 February 1979) is a retired South Korean football player, who played in the 2002 and 2006 FIFA World Cup.

Playing career

Early career
In June 2000, Song made his international debut against Macedonia under Huh Jung-moo when he was a university student. In 2001, Song started his professional career in a K League club Busan I'Cons after graduating from Yonsei University. He was named the K League Rookie of the Year in his first season. Guus Hiddink, the new manager of the South Korean national team, quickly chose him as a member of the World Cup team, and tested him in various midfield and defensive positions. He received the right back position after performing multiple roles.

While South Korea finished the 2002 FIFA World Cup in fourth place, Song was the only outfield player of the South Korean team to play all of 687 minutes in seven matches. He also nullified Luís Figo perfectly by blocking all twelve of his dribbles without a concession, making a memorable match against Portugal. He sometimes talks about his experience in marking Figo when appearing on South Korean TV programs.

Feyenoord
After the 2002 World Cup, Tottenham Hotspur and Arsenal approached Busan I'Cons to get Song, but Busan intentionally delayed the contracts in order to keep him. He strongly expressed his intention to move to a European club by moving his belongings out of the club after his deals with Premier League clubs were scuttled. He eventually joined an Eredivisie club Feyenoord. He made 56 appearances including UEFA Champions League games for Feyenoord in two seasons under Bert van Marwijk. However, his form regressed due to his ankle injuries, and he completely lost his place in the squad after Van Marwijk was replaced by Ruud Gullit.

Suwon Samsung Bluewings
Song returned to South Korea to play for Suwon Samsung Bluewings after leaving Feyenoord in January 2005. In October 2005, he injured his ankle again, and eventually underwent an operation. He came back to the field after five months, but his ability was largely debased as compared with the past.

He was selected for the national team for the 2006 FIFA World Cup despite concern about his condition, and played the first group match against Togo. He successfully obstructed Emmanuel Adebayor, and assisted South Korea's winning goal. He showed his worth better than expected, but he was excluded from the subsequent games by the manager Dick Advocaat.

Song became Suwon's key player after the 2006 World Cup, and received the armband in 2008. He scored the winning goal in the 2008 K League Championship final, leading his team to the league title.

Retirement
Song played for Al-Shabab, Ulsan Hyundai, and Tianjin Teda after leaving Suwon in the summer of 2010. He was released by Tianjin at the end of the 2011 season, and announced his retirement in March 2012.

Personal life
In 2003, Song married Kim Jung-ah to the surprise of many of his fans after dating Kim since April 2001. Before the marriage, he had been linked with multiple celebrities including Lee Jin, a member of a Korean girl band Fin.K.L. He presented a bigger surprise three years later by getting divorced. 
On 17 December 2006, he married an actress and model Park Yun-soo after an 18-month relationship. The wedding was held privately in front of 100 family and friends. Song became a father six months after the wedding. In October 2015, however, Song once again divorced his wife.

In September 2021, Song signed with DH Entertainment.

Career statistics

Club

International

Results list South Korea's goal tally first.

Filmography

Television

Honours
Busan I'Cons
Korean League Cup runner-up: 2001

Feyenoord
KNVB Cup runner-up: 2002–03

Suwon Samsung Bluewings
Pan-Pacific Championship: 2009
A3 Champions Cup: 2005
K League 1: 2008
Korean FA Cup: 2009
Korean League Cup: 2005, 2008
Korean Super Cup: 2005

Tianjin Teda
Chinese FA Cup: 2011

South Korea U20
AFC Youth Championship: 1998

South Korea
FIFA World Cup fourth place: 2002
AFC Asian Cup third place: 2007

Individual
K League Rookie of the Year: 2001
K League 1 Best XI: 2001
AFC Opta Best XI of All Time (FIFA World Cup): 2020

References

External links

 
 Song Chong-gug – National Team Stats at KFA 
 
 
 Song Chong-Gug in Ronald Zwiers 

1979 births
Living people
Association football defenders
South Korean footballers
South Korean expatriate footballers
South Korea international footballers
Busan IPark players
Feyenoord players
Suwon Samsung Bluewings players
Ulsan Hyundai FC players
K League 1 players
Chinese Super League players
Eredivisie players
Tianjin Jinmen Tiger F.C. players
Expatriate footballers in the Netherlands
Expatriate footballers in Saudi Arabia
Expatriate footballers in China
2001 FIFA Confederations Cup players
2002 FIFA World Cup players
2002 CONCACAF Gold Cup players
2006 FIFA World Cup players
2007 AFC Asian Cup players
Footballers at the 2000 Summer Olympics
Olympic footballers of South Korea
Sportspeople from North Chungcheong Province
South Korean expatriate sportspeople in the Netherlands
South Korean expatriate sportspeople in Saudi Arabia
South Korean expatriate sportspeople in China
South Korean Christians
Yonsei University alumni
Al-Shabab FC (Riyadh) players
Saudi Professional League players